Guilherme Borges Neves (born 27 November 1999), commonly known as Guilherme Borges, is a Brazilian footballer who currently plays as a midfielder for Jaraguá.

Career statistics

Club

Notes

References

1999 births
Living people
Sportspeople from Goiânia
Brazilian footballers
Association football midfielders
Campeonato Brasileiro Série D players
Atlético Clube Goianiense players
Sport Club Corinthians Paulista players
América Futebol Clube (MG) players
Villa Nova Atlético Clube players
Jaraguá Esporte Clube players
Associação Atlética Caldense players